Martim Miguel Carneiro Tavares (born 10 November 2003) is a Portuguese professional footballer who plays as a forward for Boavista.

Club career
Born in Porto, Tavares played as a youth for FC Porto, as well as having a loan to farm team Padroense F.C. in 2018–19. On 26 July 2021, after having scored 72 goals in 94 games over the last four seasons, he moved across the city to Boavista F.C. as a member of the under-19 team and also taking part with the first team.

On 14 August 2022, Tavares made his debut in the Primeira Liga as a 64th-minute substitute for Filipe Ferreira at home to C.D. Santa Clara. Within two minutes, he scored the winning goal in a 2–1 victory.

References

External links
 
 

2003 births
Living people
Portuguese footballers
Association football forwards
Boavista F.C. players
Primeira Liga players